The Bhimsen Mandir or Bhimsen Temple is an 18th-century Hindu temple located in Nalamukh, Pokhara, Nepal. Bhimsen is the patron deity of people of Newari ethnicity. The temple like many in Nepal has erotic carvings on the struts.

References

Temples in Pokhara
18th-century establishments in Nepal